Leave This Town: The B-Sides is an EP by American rock band Daughtry. It was released on March 15, 2010, to iTunes. The album features six tracks that were not included on Leave This Town. On April 11, 2011, the band announced that a physical copy of the EP was available for pre-order on the band's official website. It was officially released on May 10, 2011, and included the previously unreleased track "Back Again".

Track listing

Reception
The EP has sold a total of 12,000 copies in the United States as of January 7, 2011.

Personnel
Chris Daughtry – Lead vocals, rhythm guitar
Josh Steely – Lead guitar, backing vocals
Brian Craddock – rhythm guitar, backing vocals
Josh Paul – Bass guitar, backing vocals
Robin Diaz – drums

Charts

References

Daughtry (band) EPs
2010 debut EPs
19 Recordings EPs